is a Japanese actor from MIto, Ibaraki Prefecture.

He started his acting career at the Bungakuza Theatre Company's acting school. His first film appearance was in the Nikkatsu Roman Porno film Sei to Ai no Korider in 1977.

Filmography

Film
 Lost Chapter of Snow: Passion (1985)
 Shiki Natsuko (1980) as Nakagaki
 Dixieland Daimyo (1986) as Suzukawa Kadonosuke
 Sure Death 4: Revenge (1987) as Sugie Iori
 Rainbow Kids (1991) as Takano
 No Worries on the Recruit Front (1991)
 Lone Wolf and Cub: Final Conflict (1992) as Samurai to be executed by Ogami Ittō
 Shall We Dance? (1996)
 Gamera: Guardian of the Universe (1995) as Masaaki Saitō
 Daikaijū Tōkyō ni arawaru (1998) as Tsuguo Tadokoro
 Gamera 3: Revenge of Iris (1999) as Masaaki Saitō
 Poppoya (1999) as Miner
 Hissatsu! Shamisenya no Yuji (1999) as Asakichi
 Dora-heita (2000) as Denkichi
 Sennen no Koi Story of Genji (2001)
 Vengeance for Sale (2002) as Hotta
 Dvilman (2004) as Asuka
 Kamen Rider: The First (2005) as The Private Secretary
 Yamato (2005) as  Rear Admiral Keizō Komura
 Kamen Rider Kabuto: God Speed Love (2006) as Riku Kagami
 Oh! Oku (2006) as Arai Hakuseki
 Heaven's Flower The Legend of Arcana (2011)
 Shield of Straw (2013)
 Kamen Rider × Super Sentai × Space Sheriff: Super Hero Taisen Z (2013) as Strategist Raider
 Kikaider Reboot (2014) as Sōgorō Honda
 Tōkyō Mukokuseki Shōjo (2015)
 Your Lie in April (2016) 
 Alivehoon (2022) as Ryūji Kasai
 The Broken Commandment (2022)
 Natchan's Little Secret (2023)
 The Legend and Butterfly (2023) as Oda Nobuhide

Television
 Taiyō ni Hoero! (1977, ep.282), (1979, ep.339)
 Daitokai Part II (1977) (ep.27)
 Hissatsu Shimainin (1981) as Naojiro
 ShinHissatsu Shimainin (1982) as Naojiro
 Sanada Taiheiki (1985) as Asano Yukinaga
 Tokugawa Ieyasu (1983) as Honda Masazumi
 Nemuri Kyoshiro: Conspiracy at Edo Castle (1993) as Mibu Chushō
 Kumokiri Nizaemon (1995) as Kumagoro
 Kamen Rider Kabuto (2006) as Riku Kagami
 Ryōmaden (2010) as Kozone Kendō
 Hana Moyu (2015) as Tominaga Yūrin
 Naotora: The Lady Warlord (2017) as Nakamura Yodayū

References

External links

Hirotarō Honda official

1951 births
Living people
Japanese male film actors
Japanese male television actors
Actors from Ibaraki Prefecture
20th-century Japanese male actors
21st-century Japanese male actors